Fred Segal is a clothing and accessories retail brand founded in West Hollywood, California. Its main location is on Sunset Boulevard in West Hollywood, California, United States.

Stores
There are four Fred Segal locations in the United States as of 2022. The main store is located on Sunset Boulevard in West Hollywood, with others in Malibu,Los Angeles, and Las Vegas. Fred Segal has one international location in Seoul, South Korea.

History 
Over five decades ago, Fred Segal opened a local jeans-only store, called Pants America. This 300-square-foot store grew over the years, and with the move to Melrose Avenue in 1961, the name was changed to Fred Segal. Segal invited key managers to purchase and run select boutiques within their respective area of merchandising expertise within the Fred Segal center.

In May 2012, the worldwide licensing rights to the brand were acquired by SANDOW. In late 2012, SANDOW announced Fred Segal's expansion strategy to open new flagship locations, both internationally and domestically, launch Fred Segal’s first e-commerce site, and create private merchandise lines.

In September 2017, Fred Segal opened their flagship store on the corner of Sunset and La Cienega in West Hollywood, California.

In March 2019, Fred Segal was bought by Global Icons. Evolution Media, an investment firm created by Creative Artists Agency and TPG Capital, will maintain a minority stake.

Fred Segal opened its ninth store in Malibu in April 2019. Stores are currently spread across California, Switzerland and Kuala Lumpur.

References

External links 
 

Clothing retailers of the United States
Restaurants in Los Angeles
Companies based in Los Angeles County, California
Retail companies established in 1961
1961 establishments in California
1960s fashion
1970s fashion